Günther Karl (born 4 January 1949) is a German rower who represented West Germany.

He competed at the 1968 Summer Olympics in Mexico City with the men's coxless pair where they came twelfth. At the 1969 European Rowing Championships in Klagenfurt, he won bronze with the men's eight.

References

1949 births
Living people
German male rowers
Olympic rowers of West Germany
Rowers at the 1968 Summer Olympics
People from Passau
Sportspeople from Lower Bavaria
European Rowing Championships medalists